Arturo Malaquias (born 1975) is a Mexican long-distance runner. He was born in Toluca. He qualified to represent Mexico in marathon at the 2012 Summer Olympics in London, finishing in 70th place.

References

External links

1975 births
Living people
People from Toluca
Sportspeople from the State of Mexico
Mexican male long-distance runners
Olympic athletes of Mexico
Athletes (track and field) at the 2012 Summer Olympics